The Crooked River is an  river in Maine Township 30 MD, BPP, Maine.

See also
List of rivers of Maine

References

Maine Streamflow Data from the USGS
Maine Watershed Data From Environmental Protection Agency

Rivers of Washington County, Maine